Kalma Chowk Flyover is a flyover and a road bridge that passes through the Kalma Chowk.

References

External links 
 The Nation (Pakistani Newspaper

Bridges in Pakistan
Road interchanges in Pakistan
Streets in Lahore